Janardan Raghunath Mudholkar B.A., LL.B. (Cantab) Bar-at-Law (9 May 1902 – 27 July 1983), was an Indian Judge who served as Judge of Supreme Court of India from 3 October 1960 to 3 July 1966.

Mudholkar was educated at Elphinstone High School, Bombay; Elphinstone College, Bombay; Sidney Sussex College, Cambridge, Lincoln’s Inn, London. He practised at the Bar at Amravati during 1925–1929 and at Nagpur during 1930-1941. He was the son of Rao Bahadur Raghunath Narasinha Mudholkar, a distinguished lawyer and President of the Indian National Congress at the 1912 session in Bankipur.

He became District & Sessions Judge during September 1941 – June 1948.

He became High Court Judge at Nagpur High Court during June 1948 – October, 1956. He went to the Bombay High Court as Judge during November 1956 – September 1960 and was acting Chief Justice of the Bombay High Court during August–September 1960.

He was amongst the first Indian Supreme Court justices to proclaim the notion that later became known as the Basic Structure of the Indian Constitution.  In his separate concurring judgment agreeing with the majority to dismiss the petition of Sajjan Singh v. State of Rajasthan, Mudholkar averred, somewhat hesitatingly, that constitution had certain "basic features" that cannot be amended by Parliament through its amending powers under Article 368:

Before I part with this case I wish to make it clear that what I have said in this judgment is not an expression of my final opinion but only an expression of certain doubts which have assailed me regarding a question of paramount importance to the citizens of our country: to know whether the basic features of the Constitution under which we live and to which we owe allegiance are to endure for all time -or at least for the foreseeable future - or whether the yard no more enduring than the implemental and subordinate provisions of the Constitution.

After his retirement, Mudholkar served as a Special Judge inquiring into allegations of corruption against several Orissan politicians, including then Chief Minister R. N. Singhdeo and former Chief Minister Hare Krushna Mahatab.  Dr. Mahtab, represented by Siddhartha Shankar Ray, sued to quash Mudholkar's recommendations in the Orissa High Court.  In Dr. Harekrushna Mahtab vs The Chief Minister Of Orissa and Others Chief Justice G Mishra ruled against Mahatab, stating in his order, "...The criticism that the conclusions of Sri Mudholkar were such as could not be reached by any reasonable man is unfounded. ...The State Government fully acted within jurisdiction in getting the alienations verified by Sri Mudholkar, even though earlier it had the satisfaction that there was no prima facie case."

References

External links
 Brief biography at http://supremecourtofindia.nic.in/

Justices of the Supreme Court of India
People from Amravati
Judges of the Bombay High Court
Marathi people
1902 births
Year of death missing
Chief Justices of the Bombay High Court
20th-century Indian judges